Epsom is an unincorporated community in northern Franklin County and southern Vance County in North Carolina, United States. It is located on the county line, north-northwest of Louisburg and southeast of Henderson, at an elevation of 486 feet (148 m). The primary cross roads where the community is located are N.C. Highway 39, Epsom-Rocky Ford Road (SR 1003) and New Bethel Church Road (SR 1523). There was a post office in Epsom from September 27, 1887 to March 31, 1908.  The first postmaster was Simon W. Duke.

References

Unincorporated communities in Franklin County, North Carolina
Unincorporated communities in Vance County, North Carolina
Unincorporated communities in North Carolina